The Jericho trail is a  Blue-Blazed hiking trail in the Oakville section of Watertown, near the border with Thomaston and Plymouth, Litchfield County, Connecticut. The trail is contained almost entirely in a section of the Mattatuck State Forest. The mainline (official "Blue"  "non-dot") trail is a linear north–south "hike-through" trail with one east–west connector trail (the Blue-Blazed with yellow dot Whitestone-Jericho Connector) to the Whitestone Cliffs Blue-Blazed Trail.

The trail is listed as one of the three short 'Waterbury Area Trails' in the Connecticut Walk Book West.

The Jericho trail is a linear trail with a trailhead and parking area at the trails southern terminus on Echo Lake Road and a connector trail leading to Connecticut Route 262 in the west. The northern terminus terminates at the trail's intersection with the Mattatuck Trail near the Leatherman's Cave and Crane's Lookout. The Whitestone-Jericho Connector trail which leaves Mattatuck State Forest, travels alongside Connecticut Connecticut Route 262, going under Route 8, then over the Naugatuck River using Connecticut Route 262 before following the Naugatuck River norther before entering the Whitestone Cliffs area of the Mattatuck State Forest to meet with the Whitestone Cliffs Trail.

Notable features several scenic overlook views including an 810-foot summit with a 270 degree panorama (Crane's Lookout ). The trail stops just before Crane's Lookout and the Leatherman's Cave underneath, both which are on the Mattatuck Trail. The trail is maintained largely through the efforts of the Connecticut Forest and Park Association.

Trail description

The Jericho Trail is primarily used for hiking, backpacking, rock climbing, and in the winter, snowshoeing.

Portions of the trail are suitable for, and are used for, cross-country skiing and geocaching. Site-specific activities enjoyed along the route include bird watching, hunting (very limited), fishing, horseback riding, bouldering and rock climbing (limited).

Trail route

The mainline trail is a rectangular/oval loop bounded by Route 262 on both the east and west (and by the Naugatuck River, rail road track and Route 8 a bit farther away but parallel to the western border).

The southern terminus and parking lot on Echo Lake Road is on the northern road shoulder across from a business's driveway. This trail head is less than a quarter mile to the east of another Echo Lake Road trail head and parking lot used primarily by hunters.

The east-west Whitestone-Jericho Connector Trail can be used to connect to the Jericho trail approximately one half mile north of the southern terminus by hiking in from the east. The closest location to the Jericho Trail that the connector trail may be parked near is on Route 262 near the on and off ramps for exit 27 on Route 8.

From the north it is also possible to connect to the Jericho Trail via the Mattatuck Trail (which can be found in Black Rock State Park), or to hike in using either of two unmarked paths (which include dirt road portions), one off of Park Road the other on (see the Mattatuck State Forest Letterbox web page for details on these last two options).

Several unmarked trails, dirt forest roads, seasonal streams and a power line also cut across the trail.

The trail is almost entirely on Mattatuck State Forest property.

Trail communities

This official Blue-Blazed Jericho Trail passes through land located within the Oakville section of Watertown in Litchfield County.

The Blue and Yellow-Dot blazed Whitestone-Jericho Connector Trail enters the southernmost "finger tip" of Thomaston in Litchfield County Connecticut.

Landscape, geology, and natural environment

From high points with unobscured views (e.g. in the winter) on the trail the white stone cliffs on the Mattatuck State Forest parcel across CT-262 ("Whitestone Cliffs" section) may be seen.

History and folklore

The Blue-Blazed Jericho Trail was created by the Connecticut Forest and Park Association.

Origin and name
The trail is named for Jericho Brook which the trail follows for a length of less than a mile in the upper northern half of the trail route.

Historic sites

Several rock formations found along the trail are called caves, though they are not strictly caves.

The largest of these, the Watertown Leatherman's Cave, is a rock shelter which can be found slightly north of the northern trail head at the Mattatuck Trail junction.

Folklore
The Leatherman was a nineteenth-century vagabond who traveled approximately ten miles a day in a thirty-four (34) day circular route between New York's Hudson River in the west and the Connecticut River in the east. His circuit was also bounded by Long Island Sound in the South and the Litchfield Hills in the north.

The Leatherman spent each night in a different 'cave' on his route where he had usually left a supply of firewood and tinder to start a fire soon after he arrived. The fire's heat would warm the stone sides of the 'cave' and allow it to stay warm throughout the night. Most of the cave's provided an opening for the fire's smoke to exit while still providing shelter from cold wind and rain. The Leatherman would accept food and drink (and occasional lodging and/or treatment when ill) from concerned charitable citizens along the route.

He was known as the "Leatherman" for the outfit he wore, which was made of roughly stitched together patches of leather.

He was found dead in March 1889 near Ossining New York in his Saw Mill Woods rock shelter (apparently of mouth cancer due to his use of tobacco) and is buried at the Sparta Cemetery, Route 9, Scarborough, New York.

Hiking the trail

The mainline trail is blazed with blue rectangles. Trail descriptions are available from a number of commercial and non-commercial sources, and a complete guidebook is published by the Connecticut Forest and Park Association in the Connecticut Walk Book west. A map of the Thomaston and Watertown sections of the trail is available from the Connecticut Department of Energy and Environmental Protection at its website.

It is regularly maintained, and is considered easy hiking, with very few sections of rugged and moderately difficult hiking.

Much of the trail is close to public roads or state forest roads. There are no camping facilities along the trail and camping is generally prohibited in the areas along the trail.

Weather along the route is typical of Connecticut. Conditions on exposed ridge tops and summits may be harsher during cold or stormy weather. Lightning is a hazard on exposed summits and ledges during thunderstorms. Snow is common in the winter and may necessitate the use of snowshoes. Ice can form on exposed ledges and summits, making hiking dangerous without special equipment.

Several sections of the trail are in low-lying areas or next to (or become) seasonal streams.
Extensive flooding in ponds, puddles and streams may occur in the late winter or early spring, overflowing into the trail and causing very muddy conditions. In this case fairly high waterproof boots are recommended. Some parts of the trail follow forest roads which often contain a lot of loose stones or ruts from ATVs and four-wheel drive vehicles.

Biting insects can be bothersome during warm weather. Parasitic deer ticks (which are known to carry Lyme disease) are a potential hazard.

The trail is in Mattatuck State Forest where hunting and the use of firearms are permitted in season. Wearing bright orange clothing during the hunting season (Fall through December) is recommended.

Conservation and maintenance of the trail corridor

See also
 Blue-Blazed Trails
 Leatherman (vagabond)
 Mattatuck State Forest
 Naugatuck Railroad
 Naugatuck River
 Oakville
 Watertown

References

Further reading

External links
Specific to this trail:
 CT Museum Quest Article on the Jericho Trail
 CT Museum Quest Article on the Whitestone-Jericho Connector

Government Links:
 State of Connecticut Department of Energy and Environmental Protection page for the Mattatuck State Forest, including a map
 State of Connecticut Department of Environmental Protection Forestry Division Letterboxing Clues for Mattatuck State Forest
 Town of Watertown Website

Leatherman:
 The Legend of the Old Leatherman
 Cold Spots: The Legend of the Leatherman

 

Hiking trails in Connecticut
Protected areas of Litchfield County, Connecticut
Watertown, Connecticut